The chief minister of Manipur is the chief executive of the Indian state of Manipur. As per the Constitution of India, the governor is a state's de jure head, but de facto executive authority rests with the chief minister. Following elections to the Manipur Legislative Assembly, the state's governor usually invites the party (or coalition) with a majority of seats to form the government. The governor appoints the chief minister, whose council of ministers are collectively responsible to the assembly. Given that he has the confidence of the assembly, the chief minister's term is for five years and is subject to no term limits.

Since 1963, twelve people have served as Chief Minister of Manipur. Five of these belonged to the Indian National Congress, including the inaugural officeholder Mairembam Koireng Singh. The current incumbent Nongthombam Biren Singh is the first Chief Minister belonging to the Bharatiya Janata Party.

List

Timeline

Notes
Footnotes

References

External links

Manipur
 
Chief Ministers